"I'll Wait" is a song by Norwegian DJ Kygo and American singer-songwriter Sasha Sloan. It was released through Sony Music on 3 April 2020 as the third single from Kygo's third studio album Golden Hour. The song was written by Kyrre Gørvell-Dahll, Sasha Sloan and Scott Harris.

Music video
A music video to accompany the release of "I'll Wait" was first released onto YouTube on 3 April 2020. The music video features real-life couple Rob Gronkowski and Camille Kostek.

Personnel
Credits adapted from Tidal.
 Kyrre Gørvell-Dahll – producer, composer, lyricist, associated performer
 Scott Harris – producer, lyricist, guitar 
 Sasha Sloan – lyricist, associated performer
 Randy Merrill – mastering engineer
 Serban Ghenea – mixing engineer

Charts

Weekly charts

Year-end charts

Certifications

Release history

References

External links
 

2020 songs
2020 singles
Kygo songs
Sasha Alex Sloan songs
Song recordings produced by Kygo
Songs written by Sasha Alex Sloan
Songs written by Scott Harris (songwriter)
Songs written by Kygo